Złota may refer to the following places:
Złota, Lesser Poland Voivodeship (south Poland)
Złota, Łódź Voivodeship (central Poland)
Złota, Pińczów County in Świętokrzyskie Voivodeship (south-central Poland)
Złota, Sandomierz County in Świętokrzyskie Voivodeship (south-central Poland)
Złota, Masovian Voivodeship (east-central Poland)
Złota, Greater Poland Voivodeship (west-central Poland)

or:
Złota (river), a tributary of the San river in southeast Poland